Facchini is an Italian surname. Notable people with the surname include:

Adriano Facchini (disambiguation), multiple people
Francesco Angelo Facchini (1788–1852), Italian naturalist
Patrick Facchini (born 1988), Italian cyclist

See also
Facchini Group, Italian manufacturing company

Italian-language surnames